Robert Herlth (2 May 1893 – 6 January 1962) was a German art director. He was one of the leading designers of German film sets during the 1920s and 1930s.

Filmography

 Masks (1920)
 Island of the Dead (1921)
 The Secret of Bombay (1921)
 The Devil's Chains (1921)
 Destiny (1921)
 Playing with Fire (1921)
 Wandering Souls (1921)
 Parisian Women (1921)
 Miss Julie (1922)
 Madame de La Pommeraye's Intrigues (1922)
 Luise Millerin (1922)
 The Earl of Essex (1922)
 The Treasure (1923)
 Comedy of the Heart (1924)
 The Last Laugh (1924)
 The Chronicles of the Gray House (1925)
 Tartuffe (1926)
 Faust (1926)
 Luther (1928)
 Looping the Loop (1928)
 Whirl of Youth (1928)
 Four Devils (1928)
 Asphalt (1929)
 The Wonderful Lies of Nina Petrovna (1929)
 Manolescu (1929)
 The Flute Concert of Sanssouci (1930)
 The Temporary Widow (1930)
 Hocuspocus (1930)
 A Student's Song of Heidelberg (1930)
 Love's Carnival (1930)
 The Immortal Vagabond (1930)
 Calais-Dover (1931)
 The Man in Search of His Murderer (1931)
 The Little Escapade (1931)
 Yorck (1931)
 In the Employ of the Secret Service (1931)
 The Countess of Monte Cristo (1932)
 Congress Dances (1932)
 Man Without a Name (1932)
 The Black Hussar (1932)
 Waltz War (1933)
 Court Waltzes (1933)
 The Only Girl (1933)
 Morgenrot (1933)
 Season in Cairo (1933)
 Refugees (1933)
 The Empress and I (1933)
 Night in May (1934)
 The Eternal Dream (1934)
 The Csardas Princess (1934)
 Princess Turandot (1934)
 Au bout du monde (1934)
 The Young Baron Neuhaus (1934)
 Joan of Arc (1935)
 Amphitryon (1935)
 Les dieux s'amusent (1935)
 Barcarole (1935)
 Rêve éternel (1935)
 The Royal Waltz (1935)
 Under Blazing Heavens (1936)
 Royal Waltz (1936)
 Savoy Hotel 217 (1936)
 Hans im Glück (1936)
 The Ruler (1937)
 The Broken Jug (1937)
 You and I (1938)
 The Gambler (1938)
 The Muzzle (1938)
 Le joueur (1938)
 Opera Ball (1939)
 Maria Ilona (1939)
 Morgen werde ich verhaftet (1939)
 Roses in Tyrol (1940)
 Clothes Make the Man (1940)
 The Swedish Nightingale (1941)
 Andreas Schlüter (1942)
 A Man with Principles? (1943)
 Love Premiere (1943)
 Wenn die Sonne wieder scheint (1943)
 Melusine (1944)
 Der Fall Molander (1945)
 Die Fledermaus (1946)
 Between Yesterday and Tomorrow (1947)
 Film Without a Title (1948)
 Verspieltes Leben (1949)
 Einmaleins der Ehe (1949)
 The Legend of Faust (1949)
 Love on Ice (1950)
 Kein Engel ist so rein (1950)
 Two Times Lotte (1950)
 Beloved Liar (1950)
 Dr. Holl (1951)
 Der Teufel führt Regie (1951)
 The Sergeant's Daughter (1952)
 The White Horse Inn (1952)
 No Greater Love (1952)
 Alraune (1952)
 Behind Monastery Walls (1952)
 The Forester's Daughter (1952)
 The Divorcée (1953)
 The Village Under the Sky (1953)
 Music by Night (1953)
 The Chaplain of San Lorenzo (1953)
 The Last Summer (1954)
 Sauerbruch - Das war mein Leben (1954)
 Wedding Bells (1954)
 The Flying Classroom (1954)
 The Last Man (1955)
 Hanussen (1955)
 Beloved Enemy (1955)
 As Long as There Are Pretty Girls (1955)
 The Trapp Family (1956)
 Regine (1956)
 My Husband's Getting Married Today (1956)
 Magic Fire (1956)
 Heiße Ernte (1956)
 Devil in Silk (1956)
 The Last Ones Shall Be First (1957)
 And Lead Us Not Into Temptation (1957)
 Confessions of Felix Krull (1957)
 Resurrection (1958)
 The Trapp Family in America (1958)
 The Spessart Inn (1958)
 Taiga (1958)
 Dorothea Angermann (1959)
 The Beautiful Adventure (1959)
 The Buddenbrooks (1959)
 A Woman for Life (1960)
 You Don't Shoot at Angels (1960)
 Gustav Adolf's Page (1960)

References

Bibliography
 Reimer, Robert C. & Reimer, Carol J. The A to Z of German Cinema. Scarecrow Press, 2010.

External links

1893 births
1962 deaths
People from Wriezen
People from the Province of Brandenburg
German art directors